Thyra is a female given name, variant of Tyra. Notable people with the name include:

 Thyra (c.936-958), Danish queen
 Thyra of Denmark (1853-1933), Danish daughter of Christian IX of Denmark and Louise of Hessel-Kassel
 Thyra Alleyne (1875-1954), second daughter of Forster Alleyne of Clifton and Barbados
 Thyra Bethell (1876-1972), New Zealand organizer
 Thyra J. Edwards (1897-1953), American journalist
 Thyra Eibe (1866-1955), Danish mathematician
 Thyra Frank (born 1952), Danish nurse
 Thyra Manicus-Hansen (1872-1906), Danish artist
 Thyra Schmidt (born 1974), German artist
 Thyra Stevenson (1944-2020), American politician
 Thyra Thomson (1916-2013), American politician
 Thyra von Westernhagen (born 1973), German forester
 Thyra Samter Winslow (1885-1961), American short story writer